Meet the Prince is a lost 1926 American comedy-drama silent film directed by Joseph Henabery and starring Joseph Schildkraut and Marguerite De La Motte. It was produced by Metropolitan Pictures Corporation and distributed by Producers Distributing Corporation.

Plot 
A bankrupt Russian prince (Schildkraut) and princess (Faye) come to New York's Lower East Side to escape a revolution at home. They hatch a plan to marry rich Americans. While pretending to be rich, the prince falls in love with a poor girl (De La Motte), who herself is trying to marry for money. The prince ends up marrying the poor girl, and his sister marries a butler, but they are all happily in love.

Cast

Production 
The production included an accurate reproduction of the great reception room in the Grand Duke's palace at Petrograd, Russia.

Reception 
The film was not well received by reviewers. The plot seemed drawn out, and Schildkraut, a skilled dramatic actor, was deemed miscast in his comic role.

References 
Notes

Citations

External links 
 
 

1926 comedy-drama films
1926 lost films
1926 films
American black-and-white films
American silent feature films
Films directed by Joseph Henabery
Films set in Manhattan
Films set in Saint Petersburg
Films with screenplays by Jane Murfin
Lost American films
Producers Distributing Corporation films
Lost comedy-drama films
1920s American films
Silent American comedy-drama films
1920s English-language films